Bohemian Hall may refer to:

in the United States
Bohemian National Hall at 321 East 73d Street on the Upper East Side, Manhattan, New York
Bohemian Citizens' Benevolent Society, also known as Bohemian Hall and Park, in Astoria, Queens, New York
Bohemian National Home, in Detroit, Michigan
Czech Hall in Yukon, Oklahoma
Z.C.B.J. Hall (Arthur, Wisconsin), also known as Bohemian Hall or Zapadni Cesko Bratrske Jednota Hall
ZCBJ Lodge No. 46, in Prague, Oklahoma
Z.C.B.J. Tolstoj Lodge No. 224 in Scio, Oregon

See also
Z.C.B.J. Hall (disambiguation)